Holdenby is an English village and civil parish about  north-west of Northampton in West Northamptonshire. The parish population measured by the 2011 census was 170. The village name means "Halfdan's/Haldan's farm/settlement".

Prominent buildings
The Church of England parish church of All Saints dates from the 14th century. However, it was extensively remodelled in 1843 and 1868.

Holdenby House has associations with Sir Christopher Hatton, King James I, his son King Charles I and the Marlborough family. It is Holdenby's principal building.

Namesake
The affluent neighbourhood of Holmby Hills, Los Angeles was named after Holdenby by the millionaire Arthur Letts Sr., after the place of his birth.

Notable people
John Charles Cox, Rector of Holdenby from 1893, was a prominent local historian.
Arthur Letts Sr., business owner of Los Angeles, California

See also
Holdenby House

References

Further reading

External links

Villages in Northamptonshire
West Northamptonshire District
Civil parishes in Northamptonshire